Moravský Beroun is a town in Olomouc District in the Olomouc Region of the Czech Republic. It has about 2,900 inhabitants.

Administrative parts
Villages of Čabová, Ondrášov, Nové Valteřice and Sedm Dvorů are administrative parts of Moravský Beroun.

History
The first written mention of Moravský Beroun is from 1339. It was already referred to as a town and mopt likely was founded earlier. During the German colonization in the second half of the 16th century, the town became a centre of iron ore mining and processing.

Moravský Beroun suffered during the Thirty Years' War. The town did not recover until the end of the 18th century, when weaving production and textile industry were established. In 1872, the railway was built.

Until 1918, Bärn (named Baern before 1867) was part of the Austrian monarchy (Austria side after the compromise of 1867), in the Sternberg (Šternberk) District, one of the 34 Bezirkshauptmannschaften in Moravia.

In 1938, after the Munich Agreement, it was annexed by Nazi Germany as one of the municipalities in Reichsgau Sudetenland. The German-speaking population was expelled in 1945 according to the Beneš decrees and replaced by Czech settlers, who renamed the town.

Economy
In the locality of Ondrášov, a mineral spring was discovered in 1260. The water was declared curative in 1357. A factory for bottling of the mineral water known under the name Ondrášovka was founded in the early 20th century.

The successor of the textile industry was the company Granitol, which today deals mainly with the production of plastic technical and packaging foils and welded products from these foils. It is currently the largest manufacturer in its field in the Czech Republic.

Notable people
Ernst Späth (1886–1946), Austrian chemist

Twin towns – sister cities

Moravský Beroun is twinned with:
 Bieruń, Poland
 Gundelfingen, Germany
 Meung-sur-Loire, France
 Ostroh, Ukraine
 Scheibenberg, Germany
 Teplička nad Váhom, Slovakia

Gallery

References

External links

 

Cities and towns in the Czech Republic
Populated places in Olomouc District